Uranius Tholus is a volcano on Mars located in the Tharsis quadrangle at 26.52° north latitude and 262.43° east longitude.

Uranius Tholus is part of the Uranius group of volcanoes and lies north of the larger Ceraunius Tholus.

Volcanoes 
Tharsis is a land of great volcanoes.  Olympus Mons is the tallest known volcano. "Mons" is a term used for a large raised feature.  "Tholus" is about the same, but smaller.

References 

Tharsis quadrangle
Volcanoes of Mars